Trumaine is a given name. Notable people with the given name include:
Trumaine Johnson (cornerback) (born 1990), American football player
Trumaine Johnson (born 1960), American football player
Trumaine McBride (born 1985), American football player
Trumaine Sykes (born 1982), American football player